The  occurred on January 23, 1902, when a group of Imperial Japanese Army soldiers became lost in a blizzard on the Hakkōda Mountains in Aomori Prefecture in northern Honshu, Japan, en route to Tashiro Hot Spring located in the Hakkōda Mountains. The 199 deaths during a single ascent make it the most lethal disaster in the modern history of mountain climbing.

The Imperial Japanese Army's 8th Division's Fifth Infantry Regiment was stationed in the city of Aomori. The Imperial Japanese Army deemed it necessary to secure a route through the Hakkōda Mountains in the event that roads and railways were destroyed by shelling of the Aomori coastline by the Imperial Russian Navy during wintertime. Training in movement during winter conditions was also deemed necessary in light of a potential war with Russia, so a wintertime crossing of the Hakkōda Mountains was planned.

The 210-man unit that made the march into the Hakkōda Mountains in the snow was selected from the 3,000-man Fifth Infantry Regiment, but consisted of many men who originated from a region with little snow and lacked experience in climbing snowy mountains. The unit set out from Aomori at 6:55 AM on January 23, 1902.

At 4:00 PM, the unit reached the summit of Umatateba (732m / 2,402 ft), which was only four kilometers from the first day's objective, Tashiro Hot Spring, but the weather changed suddenly, and they were struck by a severe blizzard. In the midst of the deep snow and blizzard, the soldiers wandered the northeast slope of the Hakkōda Mountains for several days, with 193 of the 210 men freezing to death en route. A further six died within two months after rescue. Eight out of 11 survivors had to have limbs amputated due to frostbite.

The unit missed the expected return date on January 24, but the regimental HQ at Aomori remained optimistic until January 26, when a 60-man rescue party to track and find the missing men was dispatched. On January 27, the fifth day since their departure, Corporal Fusanosuke Goto, standing buried in the snow, became the first survivor discovered by the rescue party. The disaster which struck the unit marching through the Hakkōda Mountains was established based on Corporal Goto's testimony.
The 5th Regiment and the 8th Division finally were placed full-alert and launched major search-and-rescue/recover operations which lasted for months and involved tens of thousands of soldiers and villagers in total. The last survivor was found on February 2 and the last body was recovered on May 28.

On January 25, 1902, a temperature of -41 degrees (-41.8 Fahrenheit) was observed—the lowest in Japanese weather observation history, and there was an enormous low-pressure system in the skies above the Hakkōda Mountains.

Jirō Nitta wrote Death March on Mount Hakkōda: A Documentary Novel, a semi-fictional account of the disaster. James Westerhoven translated the book into English.

See also 
 Mount Hakkoda (1977 film)
 Mt. Hakkoda (2014 film)

References

External links 
 

1902 disasters in Japan
Man-made disasters in Japan
1902 in Japan
Mountaineering disasters
Mountaineering in Japan
Aomori (city)
January 1902 events